San Mauro Forte is a town and comune in the province of Matera, in the Southern Italian region of Basilicata.

History
The area was established in the sixth century.

It was probably part of Magna Graecia.

Geography
To the north are the communes of Salandra (14 km/9 miles), Oliveto Lucano (15 km/9 miles) and Garaguso (17 km/11 miles). To the east is Ferrandina (31 km/20 miles) with Craco (25 km/15 miles) and Stigliano (31 km/20 miles) to the south. Accettura is (14 km/9 miles) to the south. The provincial capital, Matera, is 70 km/44 miles away, while the administrative capital of the adjacent province, Potenza, is 66 km/41 miles away.

San Mauro Forte is included in the administrative grouping of Upland Communes of the Matera Hills.

Main sights
 Torre Normanna, "Norman Tower"

 The sixteenth-century Church of Santa Maria Assunta, in which are preserved valuable paintings from the eighteenth century;
 The Church of the Annunciation, built in the sixteenth century by Franciscan monks, with an adjoining convent;
 The Church of St. Mary of the Angels (also known as Chapel of the Rosary or Saint Lucia), of ancient origins;
 The eighteenth-century Church of St. Vincent, with a majolica tiled floor and an eighteenth-century organ;
 The noble palaces, such as Palazzo Arciaerie (today seat of the Town Hall) and Palazzo Lauria, famous for its Baroque-style portal.

Religious festivals
 The Feast of Saint Maurus, 15 January
 Campanacci, the "Festival of the Cowbell", 16 January

 St Anthony the Abbot, 17 January
 The Feast of Saint Roch, 3 September

Gallery

Demographic
Population census

See also
 Carnival of Satriano di Lucania

References

Cities and towns in Basilicata